MAD Greekz is a 24-hour Greek cable music channel that launched on September 12, 2008. It is a spin-off channel of MAD TV. It is available exclusively on NOVA and is commercial free.

Programs
Juke Box - music clips requested by viewers
Take 5 - spotlight on a different artist each day, five songs in a row
Love Mix - focus on ballads from pop to rock
Time Machine - a retro show featuring songs from the '90s
Late Show - live performances from various artists
After Hours - music mix featuring the latest hits
Greeklish - Greek artists' adaptation of foreign hits
Big Ten - Ten songs in a row from a specific artist or theme
First Table Pista - Top hits from artists currently part of the Athens night scene

See also
MAD
MAD World

Greek-language television stations
MAD TV (Greece)
Television channels and stations established in 1996
Television channels in Greece